The KNVB Cup 1985–86 started on October 9, 1985. It was held for the 68th time. The final was held on May 28, 1986, at De Meer Stadion in Amsterdam, with Ajax beating RBC 3–0.

Teams
 All 18 participants of the Eredivisie 1985-86
 All 19 participants of the Eerste Divisie 1985-86
 27 teams from lower (amateur) leagues

First round 

E Eredivisie; 1 Eerste Divisie; A Amateur teams

Replays

Second round

Replays

Third round

Replays

From quarterfinals to final

Final

Match details

Ajax would play in the Cup Winners' Cup.

See also
Eredivisie 1985-86
Eerste Divisie 1985-86

External links
 Netherlands Cup Full Results 1970–1994

KNVB Cup seasons
Knvb Cup, 1985-86
Knvb Cup, 1985-86